Bill Bruce may refer to:

 Bill Bruce (guitarist), American guitarist, producer, and songwriter
 Bill Bruce (athlete) (1923–2002), Australian athlete who won a silver medal at the 1948 Olympics in long jump
 Bill Bruce (died 1943), American airman in World War II, the Bruce–Mahoney Trophy is named partially in his honor
 Bill L. Bruce, American film producer, see Stingray (film)

See also 
 William Bruce (disambiguation)